Florence Newton (fl. 1661) was an alleged Irish witch, known as the "Witch of Youghal". The case against Newton is described as one of the most important examples of Irish witch trials. It was similar to witch trials in England, and the "most known of 17th-century witch trials in Ireland".

Witch trial
Florence Newton was described as an old beggar woman in the town of Youghal. 

She was arrested and imprisoned on 24 March 1661. She was put on trial on 11 September 1661 at the Assizes held at Cork. 
She was accused of having "enchanted" Mary Longdon and employing sorcery to cause the death of David Jones. The presiding judge was Sir William Aston, whose transcript of the trial survives and is the primary source for the affair. The Crown appears to have regarded the trial as one of some importance, as evidenced by the fact that Sir William Domville, the Attorney General for Ireland, travelled from Dublin to Cork to prosecute her in person.  Witch trials were not common in Ireland: when Newton was put on trial, no witch trial had taken place in southern Ireland since the execution of two women in Kilkenny in 1578.

According to accounts of her trial, in Christmas of 1660, Newton was heard to mumble curses after she was denied a piece of beef at the house of John Pyne. Afterwards, she met an employee of Pyne, the maidservant Mary Longdon, on the street and "violently" kissed her. Longdon then became sick, and experienced fits, cramps, and visions. Sorcery was suspected, and a coven of witches was claimed to exist in the area. Longdon claimed that Newton was responsible for her illness.

Newton was also accused of causing the death of David Jones by sorcery. At Newton's trial, the widow of Jones said that Newton had kissed the hand of Jones through the bars of a prison gate, and afterwards, he had become sick and died after having screamed the name of Newton on his death bed.

According to St John Seymour, Newton was accused of two counts of witchcraft, and court documents are missing so the verdict is not confirmed, however, "if found guilty (and we can have little doubt but that she was) she would have been sentenced to death in pursuance of the Elizabethan Statute, Section 1."

See also 
 Islandmagee witch trial
 Alice Kyteler
 Laurien Magee

References

Further reading 
 Montague Summers: Geography of Witchcraft 
 St. John Drelincourt Seymour: Irish Witchcraft and Demonology

17th-century Irish people
17th-century Irish women
People executed for witchcraft